Marvin Kevin Thomas (born July 28, 1978) is a former American football cornerback in the National Football League. high school football player at Foothill High School in Sacramento, California and a college football. He was a standout two-year letterwinner as DB and wide receiver in high school. Recorded five interceptions as senior and three as junior. Named first-team all-conference as senior as well as being the team?s defensive MVP . Tabbed second-team All-Metro as a DB. A top return man who had four punt returns for scores in 1996 . Helped Mustangs to a 12-1 record . Also a two-time all-league small forward on basketball team. In 2015 he was Inducted to Foothill High School Hall of Fame for basketball , football. A player at the University of Nevada-Las Vegas in Las Vegas, Named 2001 Mountain West Defensive Player of the Year after establishing school records with seven interceptions and three returned for TDs. In 1999, intercepted five passes and set school record with 24 pass breakups.
Known mostly for his role in the greatest play in school history. Scooped up a fumble in his own end zone and returned it 100 yards to beat Baylor 27-24 on the final play of a 1999 game. Thomas started in 46 consecutive games for the Rebels and amassed 14 interceptions, second only to Marlon Beaver's 17 picks. He was a three time MWC first-team selection as well as the conference's defensive player of the year his senior season. His 68 pass breakups easily tops the NCAA career record. Inducted into UNLV’s Hall of Fame in 2012. Nevada. Thomas was selected by the Buffalo Bills in the 6th round (176th overall) of the 2002 NFL Draft.

References

External links
Stats from databasefootball.com

1978 births
Living people
American football cornerbacks
UNLV Rebels football players
Buffalo Bills players
Players of American football from Phoenix, Arizona